Orvietana Calcio is an Italian association football club located in Orvieto, Umbria. It currently plays in Serie D.

History 
It was founded in 1910.

In the season 2011–12 it was relegated to Eccellenza.

Colors and badge 
Its colors are red and white.

Participation history

Second Division: 1931–33
Serie C: 1947–48
Serie D: 1967–78
Promozione (Promotion): 1992–93
Eccelenza: 1993–2001
Serie D: 2001–12

League and cup history

References

External links 
 Official homepage

Football clubs in Umbria
Association football clubs established in 1910
1910 establishments in Italy